VAO may mean:
Eastern Administrative Okrug of Moscow, Russia
 Vertex Arrays Object, an OpenGL feature similar to Vertex Buffer Object (VBO)
Vienna Art Orchestra, a European jazz group
VAO (sports club), a Greek sports club
IATA airport code for Suavanao Airport